Jamal Mahmoud (born 1 May 1973) is a Jordanian football manager of Palestinian origin, who was a midfielder for Al-Wehdat and Shabab Al-Ordon. He was the head coach of the Palestine national football team from 2011 to 2014.

Coaching career
Jamal coached his long life club, Al-Wehdat, under Iraqi head coaches Akram Ahmad Salman (2008–2009) and Thair Jassam (2009–2010) until he became head coach himself and transferred to coaching in Palestine. In 2013, Mahmoud lead the Palestinian national football team to its first ever win in the WAFF Championship. He also led Palestinian national team to the 2014 AFC Challenge Cup title, securing 2015 AFC Asian Cup spot for the first time in the team's history. On 10 September 2014, Mahmoud resigned as coach of the Palestinian national team, bringing and end to his three successful years at the helm of the team just four months before the 2015 Asian Cup.

Statistics

Honours
Player
Al-Wehdat
Jordan League (4)
1994 ,1995 , 1996,1997
Jordan FA Cup(3) 
1996,1997,2000
Jordan Super Cup(4)
1997, 1998, 2000, 2001
Jordan FA Shield (2)
1995, 2002

Manager 
Hilal Al-Quds
Palestine Cup (1): 2011
Palestine
AFC Challenge Cup (1): 2014
Shabab Al-Ordon
Jordan FA Shield (1): 2016
Al-Wehdat
Jordan Premier League (1): 2017–18
Jordan FA Shield (1): 2017
Jordan Super Cup (1): 2018

References

External links

1973 births
Living people
Jordanian footballers
Association football midfielders
Jordanian football managers
Expatriate football managers in the State of Palestine
Palestine national football team managers
Jordanian people of Palestinian descent
Al-Wehdat SC players
Shabab Al-Ordon Club players
Jordanian Pro League players
Al-Wehdat SC managers
Shabab Al-Ordon Club managers
Al-Ahli SC (Amman) managers
Al-Ramtha SC managers
Sahab SC managers
Jordanian expatriate football managers
Jordanian Pro League managers
Sportspeople from Amman
Al-Nasr SC (Kuwait) managers
Kuwait Premier League managers
Expatriate football managers in Kuwait
Jordanian expatriate sportspeople in Kuwait